CUFC may refer to one of the following association football clubs:

Calgary United F.C.
Cambridge United F.C.
Carlisle United F.C.
Chapungu United F.C.
Chesham United F.C.
Chin United F.C.
Chippa United F.C.
Colchester United F.C.
Cork United F.C. (disambiguation), multiple teams
Cranfield United F.C.